Shivadeva II (also spelled Sivadeva) was the son of Narendradeva and a king of the Licchavi dynasty who ruled the then Nepal in around 700 C.E.

Reign 
Shivadeva's reign started from 685 C.E. and ended in 701 C.E. He was succeeded by his son Jayadeva II.

Personal life 
He was married to Batsa Devi, the daughter of prince Bogvarma of Mankhari, and grand daughter of king Aditya Sen of Magadha. He was a devotee of Lord Shiva and also promoted the Mahayana Buddhism.

References 

Licchavi kingdom
Nepalese monarchs
History of Nepal